Laranja da China is a Brazilian musical film released in 1940, produced by Wallace Downey and directed by Ruy Costa.

Plot 
Dr. Flores is a conservative citizen, he is member of the League Against Malandragem and forbids his daughter Camélia (Dircinha Batista) dating a bohemian sambista.

Cast 
Barbosa Júnior ... Ferdinando Flores
Nair Alves ... Perpétua
Dircinha Batista ... Camélia
Paulo Neto ... Chefe da Liga
Lauro Borges ... Salchich
Arnaldo Amaral ... Arnaldo
Grande Otelo ... Boneco de Piche
Pedro Vargas ...
Carmen Miranda...
César Ladeira ...
Edmundo Maia ...
Cora Costa ...
Alvarenga ...
Francisco Alves ...
Manezinho Araújo ...
Joel de Almeida ...

References

External links

1940 musical comedy films
1940 films
Brazilian musical comedy films
1940s Portuguese-language films
Lost Brazilian films
Brazilian black-and-white films
1940 lost films
Lost musical comedy films